Jeanne Gang (born March 19, 1964) is an American architect and the founder and leader of Studio Gang (established in 1997), an architecture and urban design practice with offices in Chicago, New York, and San Francisco. Gang was first widely recognized for the Aqua Tower, the tallest woman-designed building in the world at the time of its completion. Aqua has since been surpassed by the nearby St. Regis Chicago, also of her design. Surface has called Gang one of Chicago's most prominent architects of her generation, and her projects have been widely awarded.

Biography 
Raised in Belvidere, Illinois, Gang graduated from  Belvidere High School in 1982. She went on to earn her Bachelor of Science in Architecture from the University of Illinois in 1986 and a Master of Architecture with Distinction from the Harvard Graduate School of Design in 1993. In 1989, Gang earned an  Ambassadorial Scholarship from the Rotary Foundation to study at ETH Zurich (Swiss Federal Institute of Technology). She also studied at the École nationale supérieure d'architecture de Versailles -ENSAV-, in Versailles, France. Prior to establishing Studio Gang in 1997, she worked with OMA/Rem Koolhaas in Rotterdam.

A 2011 MacArthur Fellow, Gang and her Studio were awarded the 2013 National Design Award for Architecture from the Cooper Hewitt, Smithsonian Design Museum. Gang was named the 2016 Woman Architect of the Year by the Architectural Review. In 2017, she was honored with the Louis I. Kahn Memorial Award (Philadelphia Center for Architecture) and Fellowship in the Royal Architectural Institute of Canada and was also elected to the American Academy of Arts and Sciences. In 2018, she was elected an International Fellow of the Royal Institute of British Architects (RIBA), a lifetime honor.

Currently a Professor in Practice at the Harvard Graduate School of Design (GSD), Gang has also served as the John Portman Design Critic in Architecture and a visiting critic at the GSD (2017 and 2011), a visiting studio critic at the Columbia Graduate School of Architecture, Planning and Preservation (2015), the Cullinan Visiting Professor at Rice University School of Architecture (2014), a visiting lecturer at the Princeton University School of Architecture (2007), the Louis I. Kahn Junior Visiting Professor at Yale University School of Architecture (2005), and a studio critic at the Illinois Institute of Technology.

Gang lectures frequently throughout the world. In 2016, she presented at the TEDWomen conference.

Work

Gang's built work in the Chicago area includes the University of Chicago Campus North Residential Commons, Writers Theatre, City Hyde Park, the WMS Boathouse at Clark Park and Eleanor Boathouse at Park 571 on the Chicago River, Northerly Island, Aqua Tower, the Nature Boardwalk at Lincoln Park Zoo, the Columbia College Chicago Media Production Center, and the SOS Children's Villages Lavezzorio Community Center, among others. In 2014, Gang and her Studio completed the Arcus Center for Social Justice Leadership at Kalamazoo College. Her current projects under construction include 40 Tenth Avenue in New York's Meatpacking District and Rescue Company 2 for the New York City Fire Department, as well as Vista Tower and Solstice on the Park in Chicago. Her studio is currently engaged in projects such as the Gilder Center for Science, Education, and Innovation at the American Museum of Natural History; a new United States Embassy in Brasilia, Brazil; high-rise towers in Toronto and Amsterdam; a unified campus for California College of the Arts in San Francisco; the expansion and renovation of the Arkansas Arts Center; and the Center for Arts & Innovation at Spelman College.

Studio Gang's work has been honored, published, and exhibited widely. In 2018, the Studio presented the installation Stone Stories as part of the United States Pavilion exhibition Dimensions of Citizenship at the Venice Architecture Biennale; in 2017, the Studio was selected to design the National Building Museum's Summer Block Party installation; in 2012, the Studio was featured in the solo exhibition Building: Inside Studio Gang Architects at the Art Institute of Chicago; and in 2011, the Studio participated in the Museum of Modern Art exhibition Foreclosed: Rehousing the American Dream. The Studio's work has also been shown at the Chicago Architecture Biennial (2015 and 2017) and Design Miami (2014).

Gang has authored two books—Reveal (2011), the first publication on the Studio's work and process, and Reverse Effect: Renewing Chicago's Waterways (2011), which imagines a greener future for the Chicago River. She co-edited the Art Institute of Chicago exhibition catalogue Building: Inside Studio Gang Architects in 2012.

In 2018, Gang unveiled designs for the Arkansas Art Center, a $70 million art museum and nature conservatory in Little Rock, Arkansas.  The project has been described as a "museum in a forest."

On March 27, 2019, Chicago Mayor Rahm Emanuel announced that the design team led by Gang, Studio ORD, had been selected as the winner of an international design competition for the new $2.2 billion Global Terminal at O'Hare International Airport.  The project is scheduled to begin in 2023.

Projects
 One Delisle, Toronto (pre-construction)
 California College of the Arts San Francisco Campus
 MIRA, San Francisco
 One Hundred Above the Park, St. Louis (completed 2020)
 Richard Gilder Center for Science, Education, and Innovation at the American Museum of Natural History (to be completed 2020)
 St. Regis Chicago (completed 2020)
 40 Tenth Avenue (completed 2020)
 Rescue Company 2 (to be completed 2018)
 Solstice on the Park (completed 2018)
 University of Chicago Campus North Residential Commons (completed 2016)
 Writers Theatre (completed 2016)
 City Hyde Park (completed 2016)
 Eleanor Boathouse at Park 571 (completed 2016)
 Arcus Center for Social Justice Leadership at Kalamazoo College (completed 2014)
 WMS Boathouse at Clark Park (completed 2013)
 Nature Boardwalk at Lincoln Park Zoo (completed 2010)
 Aqua Tower (completed 2010)
 Columbia College Chicago Media Production Center (completed 2010)
 SOS Children's Villages Lavezzorio Community Center (completed 2008)
 Chinese American Service League Kam Liu Center (completed 2004)
 The Bengt Sjostrom Theatre, home of the Starlight Theatre at Rock Valley College (completed 2003)

Awards and honors
World's Most Influential Architect, Time Magazine, 2019 
Winner of the Marcus Prize for Architecture presented by Univ of WI and the Marcus Corp. Foundation, 2017
Louis I. Kahn Memorial Award, Philadelphia Center for Architecture, 2017
Fellowship, Royal Architectural Institute of Canada, 2017
Elected into the American Academy of Arts and Sciences, 2017
Public Humanities Award, Illinois Humanities, 2017
Architect of the Year, Women in Architecture Awards, Architectural Review, 2016
Chicagoans of the Year, Chicago Tribune, 2016 
Chevalier dans l’Ordre national de la Légion d’Honneur, 2015 
Honorary Doctorate, Columbia College Chicago, 2014 
New Generation Leader, Women in Architecture Awards, Architectural Record, 2014  
National Design Award for Architectural Design, Cooper Hewitt, Smithsonian Design Museum, 2013
Jesse L. Rosenberger Medal, University of Chicago, 2013
Honorary Doctorate, School of the Art Institute of Chicago, 2013
Elected into the National Academy of Design, 2012
John D. and Catherine T. MacArthur Fellow, 2011
Fellow, American Institute of Architects, 2009
Academy Award in Architecture, American Academy of Arts and Letters, 2006
Rave Award Nominee, Wired Magazine, 2004
Chicagoans of the Year, Chicago Tribune, 2004
Design Vanguard, Architectural Record, 2001

Bibliography
 Reveal (2011), Princeton Architectural Press, 
 Reverse Effect: Renewing Chicago's Waterways (2011), 
 Building: Inside Studio Gang Architects (2012), Yale University Press, 
 Studio Gang: Architecture (2020), Phaidon Press,

Notes

External links and additional reading
Studio Gang official website
Surface "Organic Growth"
New Yorker "Urban Wild"
Wall Street Journal "Jeanne Gang"
New Yorker "Wave Effect"
Metropolis Magazine "Jeanne Gang: The Art of Nestin
Jeanne Gang | Tag | ArchDaily
Gauer, James. “Power Play : Studio Gang Regenerates an Electrical Plant as a Recreation Center at Beloit College in Wisconsin.” Architectural Record, Building type study 1,023. Colleges & universities, November 1, 2020, 100–104. 
Gonchar, Joann. “Newsmaker: Jeanne Gang.” Architectural Record 205, no. 2 (February 1, 2017): 22–23. 
King, John. “The Straits of Transbay : Tech Offices Are Dark and Storefronts Are Empty. But, as Residential Towers by Studio Gang and OMA Show, the Future of San Francisco’s New Mixed-Use District Is Planned for Diversity and Affordability.” Architectural Record, no. 10 (October 1, 2020): 77–79. 

20th-century American architects
University of Illinois School of Architecture alumni
Harvard Graduate School of Design alumni
Illinois Institute of Technology faculty
MacArthur Fellows
1964 births
Living people
Architects from Chicago
American women architects
Fellows of the American Institute of Architects
21st-century American architects
20th-century American women
American women academics
21st-century American women
Rice University faculty